Hassan Yussuff (born December 15, 1957) is a Guyanese-Canadian labour leader and politician. From 2014 to 2021, Yussuff served as president of the Canadian Labour Congress (CLC), the first non-white person to hold the role. In 2021, Yussuff was appointed by Prime Minister Justin Trudeau to serve as Canadian Senator from Ontario.

Early life 
Yussuff emigrated to Canada from Guyana as a young man to work as a heavy truck mechanic. Once he arrived in Toronto, Yussuff soon found employment on the plant floor of CanCar, a local automotive parts manufacturer.

Career

Canadian Auto Workers 
Yussuff first became a member of the Canadian Auto Workers (CAW) union while at CanCar. Within a year, he was elected plant chairman of Local 252 of the Canadian Auto Workers at the age of 19. Yussuff was later was elected plant chairman of the General Motors Truck Centre.

He later served as a staff representative in the organizing and service departments before being appointed as Director of the CAW Human Rights Department.

Canadian Labor Congress 
Yussuff's position led to him joining the CLC's Executive Council, where he co-chaired the CLC Human Rights Committee. In 1999, Yussuff was elected Executive Vice-President of the CLC. In 2002, Yussuff was elevated to the position of Secretary-Treasury within the CLC, serving for twelve years. On April 20, 2012, Yussuff was elected to a four-year term as President of the Trade Union Confederation of the Americas.

In 2014, Yussuff decided to challenge CLC President Ken Georgetti for his position. Following a contested election, Yussuff defeated Georgetti by 40 votes at the CLC's May 2014 convention. His victory made him the first person to unseat an incumbent CLC president.

He remained in that position until 2014, when he challenged incumbent CLC President Ken Georgetti, defeating him by 40 votes at the CLC's May 2014 convention to become CLC president. In doing so, he became first person to unseat an incumbent CLC president and the first non-white Canadian to hold the role. On June 18, 2021, Yussuff retired from office, and was replaced by Bea Bruske.

Political activity 
Following the loss of the New Democratic Party (NDP) in the 2015 federal election, Yussuff supported replacing Tom Mulcair as party leader. In 2019, Yussuff voiced concern that the federal NDP was failing to resonate with both its membership and the general electorate.

Yussuff opposed the CLC's decision to affirm its relationship with the NDP at the 2021 convention, arguing the CLC should take a more pragmatic approach to party politics.

In 2021, Yussuff co-wrote an op-ed with Perrin Beatty, CEO of the Canadian Chamber of Commerce, in support of the Canada Emergency Wage Subsidy for the Financial Post.

On June 22, 2021, Yussuff was appointed by Liberal Prime Minister Justin Trudeau to the Senate of Canada.

Personal life 

Yussuff is married to Jenny Ahn, who works as the Executive Director for Ontario Confederation of University Faculty Associations, with whom he has a daughter. In October 2018, Yussuff received an honourary Doctor of Laws degree from Ryerson University.

References

External links
 

Living people
Trade unionists from Ontario
Unifor
Presidents of the Canadian Labour Congress
Guyanese emigrants to Canada
Politicians from Toronto
1957 births
Canadian senators from Ontario
Independent Canadian senators